Matthew Willard is an American politician serving as a member of the Louisiana House of Representatives from the 97th district. He assumed office on January 13, 2020.

Early life and education 
Willard was born and raised in New Orleans. He earned a Bachelor of Science degree in marketing from the University of New Orleans.

Career 
From 2012 to 2016, Willard worked as an account executive at Schulkens Communications. He then joined Fluence Analytics, working as a growth specialist and later senior manager for marketing and communications. He was elected to the Louisiana House of Representatives in November 2019 and assumed office on January 13, 2020.

References 

Living people
Democratic Party members of the Louisiana House of Representatives
People from New Orleans
Politicians from New Orleans
University of New Orleans alumni
Year of birth missing (living people)